Rukira is a district (akarere) of the Rwandan province of Kibungo. As of 2002, It had a population of 60,330 and an area of 286 square kilometers.

References 
 

Districts and municipalities of Kibungo